

Headline event of the year
On May 17, 1939, Princeton University and Columbia University played the first televised baseball game.  On August 26, the Cincinnati Reds and the Brooklyn Dodgers played the first televised Major League Baseball game. Red Barber announced the game.
In this year, the Cuban Baseball Hall of Fame inducted its charter honorees, including José Méndez and Cristóbal Torriente.

Champions

Major League Baseball
World Series: New York Yankees over Cincinnati Reds (4–0)
All-Star Game, July 11 at Yankee Stadium: American League, 3–1

Other champions
Amateur World Series: Cuba
Negro League Baseball All-Star Game: West, 4–2 (first game, at Comiskey Park); East, 10–2 (second game, in New York City)

Awards and honors
Baseball Hall of Fame
Cap Anson
Eddie Collins
Charles Comiskey
Candy Cummings
Buck Ewing
Lou Gehrig
Willie Keeler
Charles Radbourn
George Sisler
Al Spalding
Most Valuable Player
Joe DiMaggio, New York Yankees, OF (AL)
Bucky Walters, Cincinnati Reds, P (NL)
The Sporting News Player of the Year Award
Joe DiMaggio, New York Yankees, OF
The Sporting News Most Valuable Player Award
Joe DiMaggio, New York Yankees, OF
Bucky Walters, Cincinnati Reds, P
The Sporting News Manager of the Year Award
Leo Durocher, Brooklyn Dodgers

MLB statistical leaders

Major league baseball final standings

American League final standings

National League final standings

Negro league baseball final standings

Negro American League final standings

Kansas City awarded Pennant.

Negro National League final standings

Negro National League postseason
National League Playoff Series
Homestead Grays over Philadelphia Stars (3-2)
Baltimore Elite Giants over Newark Eagles (3-1)
 National League Championship Series
Baltimore Elite Giants over Homestead Grays (3-1-1)

Events

January – May
January 24 – George Sisler, Eddie Collins and Willie Keeler are elected to the Baseball Hall of Fame by the Baseball Writers' Association of America.
April 17 – A new baseball tradition begins, as the baseball season opens in Cincinnati, home of Major League Baseball's oldest franchise. The Cincinnati Reds lose to the Pittsburgh Pirates, 7–5.
April 20 – The Boston Red Sox show off their prize rookie Ted Williams before 30,278 in Opening Day at Yankee Stadium, in a game delayed two days because of rain. After striking out twice, Williams collects a double off New York Yankees pitcher Red Ruffing, who is credited with the win in a 2–0 victory. Yankees first baseman Lou Gehrig makes an error, goes hitless, and lines into two double plays in the only game featuring the two great sluggers. Other notables in what will become a historic box score include Joe DiMaggio, Bill Dickey, Jimmie Foxx, Joe Cronin, Bobby Doerr, Red Rolfe, and losing pitcher Lefty Grove. The Yankees score their first run on a home run by Dickey and their second on an error by Foxx. Boston has baserunners in each inning, but Ruffing tosses just the second opening day shutout in Yankees history. Four umpires work the game including third base umpire George Pipgras, who was the starting pitcher for the Yankees in the  opener. Curiously, his opponent for the Red Sox that day was Ruffing.
April 21 – Ted Williams plays his first game at Fenway Park, scoring the first run for the Boston Red Sox on a Frankie Hayes passed ball, in a Boston 9–2 victory over the Philadelphia Athletics.
April 23 – Rookie Ted Williams goes 4-for-5, including his first major-league home run, a three-run blast in the first inning off Bud Thomas, but the Boston Red Sox lose to the Philadelphia Athletics, 12–8, at Fenway Park.
April 29 – In the seventh game of the season, New York Yankees center fielder Joe DiMaggio makes a sharp turn while fielding a liner facing the Washington Senators and tears muscles in his right foot. The Yankees lose the game and DiMaggio will miss the next 35 games.
April 30 – Lou Gehrig goes hitless in four at-bats against the Washington Senators and is now hitting just .143 this season. He had just played his 2,130th consecutive major league game. No one knew it would be the final game of his career.
May 2 – New York Yankees first baseman Lou Gehrig voluntarily benches himself "for the good of the team" ending his consecutive-game streak at 2,130. Babe Dahlgren replaces him in the line-up, and goes two-for-five with a home run. The Yankees beat the Detroit Tigers 22–2 behind Red Ruffing.
May 13 – In a 10-player mega-trade, the St. Louis Browns sent Beau Bell, Red Kress, Bobo Newsom and Jim Walkup to the Detroit Tigers in exchange for Mark Christman, George Gill, Bob Harris, Vern Kennedy, Chet Laabs and Roxie Lawson.
May 17 - Princeton defeats Columbia 2–1 in the first televised baseball game. W2XBS, an experimental television stations based out of New York City, broadcast the game. 
May 24 – The Detroit Tigers defeat the New York Yankees, 6–1, to spoil their twelve-game winning streak.
May 27 – The Cincinnati Reds complete a twelve-game winning streak that lands them in first place in the National League  by two games over the St. Louis Cardinals. The Reds remain in first place for the remainder of the season.
May 29 – The Chicago Cubs acquire Claude Passeau from the Philadelphia Phillies in exchange for Kirby Higbe, Joe Marty and Ray Harrell.

June – July
June 4 – The St. Louis Browns sweep a double header from the Washington Senators to end an eleven-game losing streak. The Browns then go on to lose their next six in a row. The Browns never won more than two games in a row all season.
June 5 – Detroit Tigers pitcher Tommy Bridges holds the New York Yankees to just four hits as the Yankees are shut out for the only time all season, 3–0.
June 6 – The first Little League game took place in Williamsport, Pennsylvania. Lundy Lumber defeated Lycoming Dairy, 23–8.
June 12 – In Cooperstown, New York, the official dedication of the National Baseball Hall of Fame takes place. Grover Alexander, Ty Cobb, Eddie Collins, Walter Johnson, Nap Lajoie, Babe Ruth, George Sisler, Tris Speaker, Honus Wagner, Cy Young and Connie Mack are all present, and accept their plaques.
 In an exhibition game against the Kansas City Blues, a Yankees farm club, Lou Gehrig makes his final appearance in a game for the Yankees. He hits a grounder in his only at bat and is thrown out at first. 
June 14 – The Cleveland Indians trade Earl Averill to the Detroit Tigers for Harry Eisenstat and cash, and send Art Jacobs to the Cincinnati Reds for Earl Cook and cash.
June 19 – On his 36th birthday, Lou Gehrig is diagnosed with Amyotrophic lateral sclerosis or ALS. Gehrig would die two years later of the disease that now bears his name.
June 26 – The New York Yankees played the first night game in franchise history and they lost to the Philadelphia Athletics, 3–2, at Shibe Park.
June 28 – The New York Yankees defeat the Philadelphia Athletics 23–2 and 10–0 in a double header. In the first game, the Yankees hit eight home runs, and followed that with five more in the second. Both totals set a Major League record for most home runs in a game as well as their total of fifty-three total bases in a doubleheader.
July 3 – In the St. Louis Cardinals' 5–3 victory over the Chicago Cubs, Johnny Mize goes four-for-four, equaling a National League record four extra-base hits, including a double, triple and two home runs.
July 4 – Lou Gehrig Appreciation Day is celebrated at Yankee Stadium. Numerous people, including many from other major league teams, came forward to give Gehrig gifts and to shower praise on the dying slugger. The Yankees retired his uniform number (4), becoming the first player in major league history to be afforded that honor. Babe Ruth even showed up and ended their long-standing feud by giving his old teammate a hug. After the presentations, Gehrig approached the microphone, and addressed the crowd:

July 8 – The Washington Senators' Mickey Vernon makes his major league debut as a pinch runner in the first game of a double header with the Philadelphia A's. He does not log an at-bat, however, he goes one-for-five in the second game and scores a run.
July 9 – The Philadelphia Phillies defeat the Boston Bees, 3–1, to snap an eleven-game losing streak.
 July 11 – In the first of three times that the All-Star Game has been held at Yankee Stadium, the American League defeats the National League, 3–1, behind pitchers Red Ruffing, Tommy Bridges, and Bob Feller, and a home run by Joe DiMaggio.
July 16 – The Boston Red Sox sweep a double header from the Detroit Tigers that brings their winning streak to twelve games.
July 18 – The Brooklyn Dodgers acquire Boston Red Sox farmhand Pee Wee Reese.
July 25 – Yankees pitcher Atley Donald sets a league record for consecutive wins by a rookie, bringing his record to 12–0 with a 5–1 victory over the St. Louis Browns.
July 26 – The New York Yankees tied a major league record by scoring in every inning against the St. Louis Browns. Bill Dickey hit three home runs in the 14–1 win.

August – September
August 5 – The New York Yankees trade Vince DiMaggio to the Cincinnati Reds.
August 6 – Already behind 10–1 to the Detroit Tigers, Boston Red Sox manager Joe Cronin sends Jimmie Foxx to the mound to pitch the ninth inning. He records a perfect 1–2–3 inning.
 In The East/West Negro League All Star Game, Ted Radcliffe leads the West to a 4-2 win. The game is played at Comiskey Park, with a recorded attendance of 40,000 fans.
August 9
Red Rolfe of the New York Yankees started a streak of 18 consecutive games in which he scored at least one run. During those games, he scored a total of 30 runs.
With a 5–3 victory over the Pittsburgh Pirates, the St. Louis Cardinals complete a ten-game winning streak. They are still, however, eight games back of the first place Cincinnati Reds. The Reds snap the streak on August 12, however, the Cards take two of their three meetings at Sportsman's Park to move within 6.5 of first place.
August 14 - The Chicago White Sox defeat the St. Louis Browns 5-2. it was the first night baseball game ever played in the city of Chicago. 
August 20 – The Pittsburgh Pirates and Chicago Cubs split a double header at Forbes Field. The victory in the second game snaps a twelve-game losing streak for the Bucs.
August 22 - The New York Yankees defeat the Chicago White Sox 14-5 at Comiskey Park, with the Yankees winning their first night game in franchise history. 
August 26 – The double header between the Brooklyn Dodgers and Cincinnati Reds at Ebbets Field is telecast on Channel W2XBS in Brooklyn.
September 13 – Early Wynn loses his major league debut, 4–2 to the Chicago White Sox.
September 18 – The St. Louis Browns lose their 100th game of the season, 6–2 to the New York Yankees.
September 19 – The New York Yankees defeat the Chicago White Sox, 6–2, for their 100th victory of the season.
September 23 – The Brooklyn Dodgers defeat the Philadelphia Phillies 22–4. The Dodgers go on to sweep the Phillies in the four game set at Shibe Park, handing them losses number 100 and 101 on the 24th.
September 29 – The second game of the double header between the Cleveland Indians and Detroit Tigers at Briggs Stadium is called after five innings due to rain. Hal Newhouser pitches all five innings for Detroit, and is the losing pitcher in his major league debut.
September 30 – In the second game of a double header with the Chicago Cubs, St. Louis Cardinals pitcher Murry Dickson makes his major league debut. He pitches 3.2 without giving up a run, and strikes out in his only at-bat.

October – December
October 4 – Bill Dickey's single in the bottom of the ninth wins game one of the 1939 World Series for the New York Yankees, 2–1. This is the first World Series appearance for the Cincinnati Reds in 20 years.
October 5 – Monte Pearson holds the Cincinnati Reds to just two hits, as the Yankees take game two of the World Series, 4–0.
October 7 – The Reds take a 3–2 lead in the second inning only to have Joe DiMaggio hit a two-run home run in the top of the third to put the Yankees on top for good on their way to a 7–3 victory.
October 8 – An error by Billy Myers allows the Yankees to tie it in the ninth. Then, costly errors in the tenth inning by Myers, Ival Goodman and Bucky Walters lead to three runs as the New York Yankees defeat the Cincinnati Reds, 7–4, in Game Four of the World Series to win a record fourth consecutive World Championship, and eighth overall, four games to none.
November 12:
Dom DiMaggio, the youngest of the three DiMaggio brothers, is acquired for $40,000 by the Boston Red Sox from the San Francisco Seals of the Pacific Coast League. DiMaggio will spend his entire Major League career with the Red Sox, hitting .298 in 1399 games and making seven All-Star AL teams.
Pitcher Victor Starffin wins his 42nd game in a 96-game season of the Japanese Professional Baseball League, leading the Yomiuri Giants to the Championship title, while setting a post-1900 World Record for season victories that will be equaled by Kazuhisa Inao in  but never broken. Starffin will follow his record performance with another 38 wins in 1940. From 1936 through 1955 Starffin won 303 games, to become the first pitcher in Japanese baseball history to reach 300 victories.
November 29 – Judge Landis fines the Brooklyn Dodgers, Detroit Tigers and the St. Louis Browns minor league club, Columbus, for manipulating player contracts. Landis frees seven farm hands.
December 6 – In a trade of veteran shortstops, or "worn-out shortstops", as one newspaper described it, the Chicago Cubs acquire Billy Rogell from the Detroit Tigers for Dick Bartell. Rogell, who injured his arm playing handball the previous year, hits just .136 before hanging up his spikes. The Tigers will release "Rowdy Richard" five games into the  season, but he will stick with the New York Giants until .
December 9 – The Detroit Tigers trade Benny McCoy and George Coffman to the Philadelphia A's for Wally Moses. The trade is voided by Commissioner Kenesaw Mountain Landis, and the players return to their original teams on January 14, . The commissioner declared McCoy a free agent because he had been "hidden" from other teams. Judge Landis declares 87 more Tigers farmhands free agents due to their concealment in the minor leagues.
December 29 – The Chicago White Sox sell the contracts of Norm Schlueter and Hank Steinbacher to the St. Louis Browns, then send Tony Rensa, Jesse Landrum and cash to Oklahoma City (Texas) for Don Kolloway.

Births

January
January 9 – Guido Grilli
January 14 – Tim Talton
January 14 – Sandy Valdespino
January 21 – Norm Bass
January 29 – Bobby Bolin

February
February 7 – Frank Kreutzer
February 8 – Harvey Branch
February 11 – Willie Smith
February 12 – Jim Lawrence
February 12 – Jerry Walker
February 18 – Jesse Hickman
February 18 – Dal Maxvill
February 18 – Bob Miller
February 19 – Jackie Moore
February 19 – Jim Weaver
February 25 – Denny Lemaster

March
March 4 – Jack Fisher
March 6 – Cookie Rojas
March 8 – Jim Bouton
March 10 – Bill Heath
March 12 – Johnny Callison
March 13 – Al Luplow
March 21 – Tommy Davis
March 23 – Bobby Dews
March 26 – Al Neiger

April
April 1 – Phil Niekro
April 1 – Nick Peters
April 3 – Hawk Taylor
April 16 – Bernie Allen
April 18 – Von McDaniel
April 19 – Gustavo Gil
April 23 – Chico Fernández
April 30 – Bob Hendley

May
May 2 – Gates Brown
May 6 – Russ Gibson
May 9 – Herb Hippauf
May 11 – Héctor Martínez
May 11 – Milt Pappas
May 11 – Frank Quilici
May 17 – Dick Smith
May 24 – Jim Duckworth
May 25 – Gene Budig

June
June 4 – Phil Linz
June 9 – Doug Clemens
June 9 – Julio Gotay
June 11 – Jimmy Stewart
June 15 – Ty Cline
June 18 – Lou Brock

July
July 8 – Ed Keegan
July 15 – Mike Shannon
July 25 – Santiago Rosario
July 31 – Vic Davalillo

August
August 4 – Dennis Higgins
August 4 – Bob Meyer
August 5 – Tommie Aaron
August 9 – Claude Osteen
August 10 – Johnny Lewis
August 10 – Charlie Shoemaker
August 13 – Bill Stafford
August 18 – Joe Azcue
August 21 – Jim Beauchamp
August 22 – Carl Yastrzemski
August 24 – Rick Joseph
August 25 – Dooley Womack
August 29 – Dave Nicholson
August 29 – Frank Zupo

September
September 1 – Rico Carty
September 13 – Tom Parsons
September 17 – Carl Bouldin
September 17 – Jim Woods
September 22 – Stover McIlwain
September 24 – Dick Nen
September 28 – Bruce Froemming

October
October 2 – Paul Doyle
October 4 – Ted Davidson
October 5 – Dennis Bennett
October 6 – Jack Cullen
October 7 – John O'Donoghue
October 7 – Phil Ortega
October 9 – Mike Hershberger
October 15 – Lou Klimchock
October 21 – Ted Uhlaender
October 23 – George Williams
October 25 – Pete Mikkelsen
October 29 – Pete Richert
October 31 – Ed Stroud

November
November 13 – Wes Parker
November 24 – Jim Northrup
November 27 – Dave Giusti
November 29 – Jim Derrington
November 29 – Dick McAuliffe
November 29 – Joe Reliford

December
December 3 – Ed Connolly
December 3 – Ron Stillwell
December 10 – Bob Priddy
December 18 – Zoilo Versalles
December 22 – Al Ferrara
December 25 – Chris Krug
December 26 – John Braun

Deaths

January
January 7 – Bert Weeden, 56, pinch-hitter for the 1911 Boston Rustlers and also a catcher/manager in the minors during 17 seasons spanning 1903–1923.
January 9 – Louis Pelouze, 75, outfielder for the St. Louis Maroons in the 1886 season.
January 13 – Jacob Ruppert, 71, brewery magnate who was co-owner (1915–1923), then sole owner (1923 until his death), of the New York Yankees; acquired Babe Ruth (1919), built Yankee Stadium (1923), and oversaw creation of a "Bronx Bombers" dynasty that would win ten American League pennants and seven World Series titles between 1921 and 1938; elected posthumously to Baseball Hall of Fame (2013).
January 18 – Cliff Heathcote, 40, outfielder who hit .275 with 42 home runs and 448 RBI for the St. Louis Cardinals, Chicago Cubs, Cincinnati Reds and Philadelphia Phillies over 15 seasons from 1918 to 1932, and a member of the Cubs club that won the National League pennant in 1929.
January 25 – Abner Dalrymple, 81, outfielder who played from 1878 through 1891 for the Milwaukee Grays, Chicago White Stockings, Pittsburgh Alleghenys, and Milwaukee Brewers, and also a prolific hitter who, at the time of his retirement, had collected several titles in batting average, home runs, hits, and runs scored.
January 28 – Bill Cristall, 63, Ukrainian born pitcher who played briefly for the Cleveland Blues in 1901.

February
February 6 – Joe Crisp, 53, catcher who played from 1910 to 1911 for the St. Louis Browns.
February 12 – George Fair, 83, second baseman who played briefly for the New York Mutuals in the 1876 season.
February 22 – Frank Morrissey, 62, pitcher who played with the Boston Americans in 1901 and for the Chicago Orphans in 1902.

March
March 2 – Alex McFarlan, 59, outfielder for the 1892 Louisville Colonels.
March 8 – Scott Stratton, 69, pitcher for three teams from 1888 to 1895, primarily with the Louisville Colonels, who posted 34 wins in 1890 which included 15 straight victories, while leading the American Association in winning percentage and ERA in the same season.
March 15 – Cal Broughton, 78, catcher who played for six different American Association and National League teams in part of four seasons spanning 1883–1888.
March 16 – Sam Dungan, 72, right fielder who hit .301 for three teams in a span of five seasons from 1892 to 1901, while posting a very solid 3.14 walk-to-strikeout ratio (116-to-37) in 382 games.
March 17 – William Burke, 73, pitcher/outfielder for the 1887 Detroit Wolverines of the National League.
March 18 – Ralph Miller, 43, third baseman who played from 1920 to 1921 with the Philadelphia Phillies and for the Washington Senators in 1924.
March 25 – Tiny Chaplin, 33, pitcher who played for the New York Giants and the Boston Bees in four seasons between 1928 and 1936.
March 28 – Fred Goldsmith, 82, pitcher for four different teams between 1875 and 1884, who steadfastly claimed that he had first thrown the curveball in 1870, six years earlier than Candy Cummings, who gained credit for the development of the pitch.

April
April 5 – Fred Curtis, 58, first baseman who played for the New York Highlanders in the 1905 season.
April 27 – Chauncey Fisher, 67, pitcher for the Cleveland Spiders, Cincinnati Reds, Brooklyn Bridegrooms, New York Giants and St. Louis Cardinals in parts or all of 16 seasons from 1893 to 1901.

May

May 16 – Hal Kime, 41, pitcher who played with the St. Louis Cardinals during the 1920 season.
May 22 – Fred Link, 53, pitcher who played for the Cleveland Naps and the St. Louis Browns in the 1910 season.
May 24 – Barney Pelty, 58, pitcher for the St. Louis Browns from 1903 to 1912, as well as one of the first Jewish players to play in the American League.
May 29 – Bill McCarthy, 57, pitcher for the 1906 Boston Beaneaters.

June
June 6 – Simmy Murch, 58, infielder who played for the St. Louis Cardinals and Brooklyn Superbas in part of three seasons spanning 1904–1908.
June 8 – Pat Paige, 57, pitcher for the Cleveland Naps during the 1911 season.
June 11 – John Henry, 75, outfielder/pitcher for the Cleveland Blues, Baltimore Orioles, Washington Nationals and New York Giants in a span of four seasons from 1884 to 1890.
June 17 – Allen Sothoron, 46, spitball pitcher and a master of trick deliveries between the 1914 and 1926 seasons, who spent most of his career with the St. Louis Browns and the St. Louis Cardinals, and later coached and managed in the minors from 1928 to 1938.
June 18 – Murphy Currie, 45, pitcher for the St. Louis Cardinals in 1916.
June 25 – Heinie Smith, 67, second baseman for the Louisville Colonels, Pittsburgh Pirates, New York Giants and Detroit Tigers between 1897 and 1903, who also managed the Giants in the 1902 season.

July
July 7 – Deacon White, 91, Hall of Fame catcher and third baseman who, despite playing without a glove, mask, chest protector and shin guards, caught more games (409) than any catcher during the 1870s and later became a member of the legendary Big Four infield with Dan Brouthers (1B), Hardy Richardson (2B) and Jack Rowe (SS), while being one of the game's most feared hitters – winning two batting titles (1875; 1877) and three RBI crowns (1873; 1876–1877) – as well as a major figure on five consecutive championship teams from 1873 through 1877.
July 15 – Ed Biecher, 63, outfielder who played from 1897 to 1898 with the St. Louis Browns and Cleveland Spiders, and remained active as a player/manager in the Minor Leagues through 1903.
July 18 – J. Louis Comiskey, 53, son of Charles Comiskey and owner of the Chicago White Sox from October 26, 1931 until his death.
July 20 – Jack Reis, 48, pitcher who played briefly for the St. Louis Cardinals in the 1911 season.
July 26 – Peaches Graham, 62, catcher who played for the Cleveland Bronchos, Chicago Cubs, Boston Doves/Rustlers and Philadelphia Phillies over seven seasons spanning 1902–1912.
July 29 – John Sowders, 72, pitcher who played with the Indianapolis Hoosiers in 1887 and for the Kansas City Cowboys and Brooklyn Ward's Wonders from 1889 to 1890.

August
August 12 – Jack Darragh, 73, first baseman for the 1891 Louisville Colonels of the National League.
August 28 – Dave Oldfield, 74, catcher/outfielder who played with the Baltimore Orioles in 1883 and for the Brooklyn Grays and Washington Nationals from 1885 to 1886.

September
September 17 – Tom Hart, 70, catcher/outfielder for the 1891 Washington Statesmen.
September 18 – Toots Coyne, 44, third baseman who played for the Philadelphia Athletics during the 1914 season.
September 25 – Frank LaPorte, 59, infielder who posted four .300 seasons in an eleven-year career, led the Federal League for the most RBI in 1914, and was the first man to play both for the New York Yankees and Boston Red Sox intense rivals.
September 27 – Sweetbread Bailey, 44, pitcher who played from 1919 through 1921 for the Chicago Cubs and Brooklyn Robins, and also served in the military during World War I conflict.

October
October 9 – Biff Schaller, 50, outfielder who played with the Detroit Tigers in 1911 and the Chicago White Sox in 1913.
October 16 – Nick Allen, 51, catcher for the Buffalo Buffeds, Chicago Cubs and Cincinnati Reds in a span of six seasons from 1914 to 1920, who later played and managed in the minor leagues through 1936 and earned the nickname "Roarin' Nick" for his notorious altercations with umpires.
October 17 – George Bristow, 69, outfielder for the 1899 Cleveland Spiders and later a long time player and manager in the minor leagues.
October 19 – Red Downs, 56, second baseman for the Detroit Tigers, Brooklyn Dodgers and Chicago Cubs from 1907 through 1912, and also a member of the Tigers club that won the American League pennant in 1908, who gained notoriety later as an armed robber during the Great Depression.
October 22 – Dale Williams, 84, pitcher for the Cincinnati Reds in the 1876 season.
October 26 – Ed Lennox, 55, third baseman who played for the Philadelphia Athletics, Brooklyn Superbas, Chicago Cubs and Pittsburgh Rebels in parts of six seasons spanning 1906–1915.

November
November 4 – Pete Henning, 51, pitcher who played for the Kansas City Packers in the 1914 and 1915 seasons.
November 15 – Tom Richardson, 56, pinch-hitter in one game for the St. Louis Browns of the American League.
November 18 – Horace Helmbold, 72, pitcher for the Philadelphia Athletics of the American Association in 1890.
November 11 – Frank Abercrombie, 88, shortstop for the 1871 Philadelphia Athletics.
November 19 – Frank Mountain, 79, pitcher for six different teams in seven seasons from 1880 to 1886, who won 20 games twice and hurled a no-hitter in 1884.
November 26 – Frank Harris, 81, pitcher who played with the Altoona Mountain City of the Union Association in 1884.
November 27 – Jack Fifield, 68, pitcher who played from 1897 through 1899 for the Philadelphia Phillies and Washington Senators of the National League.

December
December 3 – Frank Killen, 69, pitcher for the Milwaukee Brewers,  Washington Senators, Pittsburgh Pirates, Boston Beaneaters and Chicago Orphans, who won 164 games from 1891 to 1900, including two 30-win seasons and two 20-win seasons.
December 11 – Dallas Bradshaw, 44, second baseman who played briefly for the Philadelphia Athletics in the 1917 season.
December 18 – Heywood Broun, 51, sportswriter and editor in New York City since the early 1910s.
December 26 – Clyde Engle, 55, valuable utility at all positions except pitcher and catcher for four teams from 1909 through 1916, who scored the tying run for the Boston Red Sox in the 10th inning of final Game 8 of the 1912 World Series after his earlier pop fly had been dropped, preserving the victory for the eventual champions Red Sox.

References